Mamannar Kalingarayan Canal is a  long irrigation canal in the Erode district, Tamil Nadu, India. It was constructed by Chieftain Mamannar Kalingarayan Gounder and completed in 1283. The canal's source is the Kalingarayan Anicut dam near Bhavani, Erode.

Project, including the canal and the Kalingarayan Anicut dam started in 1271 and was completed in 1283, taking over 12 years.
The dam was constructed by Kalingarayan king.

Course and architecture
The canal connects Bhavani and Noyyal rivers, two major tributaries of the Kaveri. It is one of the oldest river linking projects in India. The Canal starts at Kalingarayan Anicut on Bhavani river and joins Noyyal river near Kodumudi. The canal crosses three other canals via aqueducts.
Sunnambu Canal near Suriyampalayam
Pichaikaranpallam Canal near BP Agraharam
Perumpallam Canal near Karaivaikkal

Environmental Threats
As the initial portion of the canal runs through the highly industrialized and urbanized areas of Erode Municipal Corporation, the discharge of untreated effluents from the textile dyeing units and leather tanneries introduce major pollutants.  To prevent mixing of sewage into the canal, the Government of Tamil Nadu have built concrete walls on the sides and a baby canal of  has been constructed alongside the main canal to carry the sewage. The entire stretch of first  of the canal running through Erode Municipal Corporation is proposed to be provided with concrete lining and baby canal in phased manner. Also, navigable roads were developed along the banks throughout this stretch.

See also
LBP Canal

References

Erode district
Bhavani River
Canals in Tamil Nadu